Marcel Kleizen (born 15 April 1986) is a Dutch former professional footballer who played as a forward.

Club career
Kleizen made his debut in professional football for FC Twente in the 2005–06 Eredivisie season, playing five matches without scoring a goal. In the 2007–08 season, he was sent on loan to Zwolle.

He last played for Emmen on loan from Zwolle. After the 2008–09 season, Kleizen  retired from professional football.

International career
Kleizen received one call-up for the Netherlands U20 team, making his debut on 5 June 2007 in a 0–0 draw against Portugal.

Retirement
In 2016, Kleizen became the unofficial European bicycle courier champion. After his football career, he had become a bicycle deliveryman for Cycloon Fietskoeriers.

References

1986 births
Living people
Sportspeople from Hengelo
Dutch footballers
FC Twente players
PEC Zwolle players
FC Emmen players
Eredivisie players
Eerste Divisie players
Association football forwards
Netherlands youth international footballers
Footballers from Overijssel